Antonio Citterio (born 1950, in Meda) is an Italian architect, furniture designer and industrial designer who lives and works in Milan.

He acquired a degree in architecture from Politecnico di Milano in 1972 and subsequently started working as a designer and industrial design consultant. From 1987 to 1996, he worked in association with Terry Dwan, designing buildings in Europe and Japan.

In 2000, with Patricia Viel, founds "Antonio Citterio Patricia Viel" a cross-disciplinary practice for architecture and interior design. The firm works internationally, developing complex projects on all scales in collaboration with a qualified network of specialist consultants.

Antonio Citterio currently works in the industrial design sector with companies such as Ansorg, Arclinea, Axor-Hansgrohe, B&B Italia, Flexform, Flos, Hermès, Iittala, Kartell, Maxalto, Sanitec (Geberit Group), Technogym and Vitra.

In 1987 and 1994, Antonio Citterio was awarded the "Compasso d’Oro" prize. From 2006 to 2016, he has been a Architectural Design professor at the Accademia di Architettura di Mendrisio (Switzerland). In 2008, the Royal Society for the Encouragement of Arts, Manufactures & Commerce of London awarded him the title of "Honorary Royal Designer for Industry".

Awards
Continental Winners Prix Versailles 2018

External links

References

1950 births
Living people
Italian furniture designers
Italian industrial designers
Polytechnic University of Milan alumni
Compasso d'Oro Award recipients